Kepler-15b is a planet discovered by the Kepler spacecraft. It is a hot Jupiter, with a mass of 0.66 MJ, a radius 0.96 RJ and a period of about 4.94 days.

See also
 Kepler-15 - the host star

References

15b
Transiting exoplanets
Exoplanets discovered in 2011